Brahmananda Keshab Chandra College, established in 1956, is an undergraduate college in Baranagar, Kolkata, West Bengal, India. It was named after the nineteenth century social reformer Keshab Chandra Sen. Popularly known as B.K.C. College, the institution was established with the aim of filling a vacuum in higher education in North 24 Parganas.
This College is a Govt. of West Bengal aided degree college affiliated to the West Bengal State University and upgraded from Bachelor’s to Master’s degree in the list of Colleges included u/s 2(f) and 12(b) of the UGC Act, 1956 vide UGC letter No. 8-104/2019(CPP-I/C) dated 17/12/2019.Two Post Graduate courses are conducting: M.Sc in Mathematics and M.Sc in Botany.

History of the college 
In 1954, professor J. C. Ghosh, the then vice-chancellor of the University of Calcutta, surveyed the available higher educational facilities in North 24 Parganas. The survey revealed that facilities were inadequate given the huge influx of refugees in the area. His suggested solution called for ten new colleges in the area, covering both male and female students and the study of both humanities and sciences, and funded by the Central Relief and Rehabilitation Ministry, Government of India. This plan was accepted and Brahmananda Keshab Chandra College was thus established in 1956 as one of the colleges under this scheme. Initially the college was housed at Sagar Dutta Free High School, Kamarhati, but later moved to its own premises in 1957.

Until 2008, the college was affiliated to the University of Calcutta. It is now affiliated with the West Bengal State University

References

External links
Brahmananda Keshab Chandra College

Educational institutions established in 1956
Colleges affiliated to West Bengal State University
1956 establishments in West Bengal
Baranagar